A colocation center (also spelled co-location, or colo) or "carrier hotel", is a type of data centre where equipment, space, and bandwidth are available for rental to retail customers. Colocation facilities provide space, power, cooling, and physical security for the server, storage, and networking equipment of other firms and also connect them to a variety of telecommunications and network service providers with a minimum of cost and complexity.

Configuration
Many colocation providers sell to a wide range of customers, ranging from large enterprises to small companies. Typically, the customer owns the information technology (IT) equipment and the facility provides power and cooling. Customers retain control over the design and usage of their equipment, but daily management of the data center and facility are overseen by the multi-tenant colocation provider.

 Cabinets – A cabinet is a locking unit that holds a server rack. In a multi-tenant data center, servers within cabinets share raised-floor space with other tenants, in addition to sharing power and cooling infrastructure.
 Cages – A cage is dedicated server space within a traditional raised-floor data center; it is surrounded by mesh walls and entered through a locking door. Cages share power and cooling infrastructure with other data center tenants.
 Suites – A suite is a dedicated, private server space within a traditional raised-floor data center; it is fully enclosed by solid partitions and entered through a locking door. Suites may share power and cooling infrastructure with other data center tenants, or have these resources provided on a dedicated basis.
 Modules – data center modules are purpose-engineered modules and components to offer scalable data center capacity. They typically use standardized components, which make them easily added, integrated or retrofitted into existing data centers, and cheaper and easier to build. In a colocation environment, the data center module is a data center within a data center, with its own steel walls and security protocol, and its own cooling and power infrastructure. "A number of colocation companies have praised the modular approach to data centers to better match customer demand with physical build outs, and allow customers to buy a data center as a service, paying only for what they consume."

Building features
Buildings with data centres inside them are often easy to recognize by the amount of cooling equipment located outside or on the roof.

Colocation facilities have many other special characteristics:
 Fire protection systems, including passive and active elements, as well as implementation of fire prevention programmes in operations. Smoke detectors are usually installed to provide early warning of a developing fire by detecting particles generated by smouldering components prior to the development of flame. This allows investigation, interruption of power, and manual fire suppression using hand held fire extinguishers before the fire grows to a large size. A fire sprinkler system is often provided to control a full scale fire if it develops. Clean agent fire suppression gaseous systems are sometimes installed to suppress a fire earlier than the fire sprinkler system. Passive fire protection elements include the installation of fire walls around the space, so a fire can be restricted to a portion of the facility for a limited time in the event of the failure of the active fire protection systems, or if they are not installed.
 19-inch racks for data equipment and servers, 23-inch racks for telecommunications equipment
 Cabinets and cages for physical access control over tenants' equipment. Depending on one's needs a cabinet can house individual or multiple racks.
 Overhead or underfloor cable rack (tray) and fibreguide, power cables usually on separate rack from data
 Air conditioning is used to control the temperature and humidity in the space. ASHRAE recommends a temperature range and humidity range for optimal electronic equipment conditions versus environmental issues. The electrical power used by the electronic equipment is converted to heat, which is rejected to the ambient air in the data centre space. Unless the heat is removed, the ambient temperature will rise, resulting in electronic equipment malfunction. By controlling the space air temperature, the server components at the board level are kept within the manufacturer's specified temperature and humidity range. Air conditioning systems help keep equipment space humidity within acceptable parameters by cooling the return space air below the dew point. Too much humidity and water may begin to condense on internal components. In case of a dry atmosphere, ancillary humidification systems may add water vapour to the space if the humidity is too low, to avoid static electricity discharge problems which may damage components.
 Low-impedance electrical ground
 Few, if any, windows

Colocation data centres are often audited to prove that they attain certain standards and levels of reliability; the most commonly seen systems are SSAE 16 SOC 1 Type I and Type II (formerly SAS 70 Type I and Type II) and the tier system by the Uptime Institute or TIA. For service organizations today, SSAE 16 calls for a description of its "system". This is far more detailed and comprehensive than SAS 70's description of "controls". Other data center compliance standards include Health Insurance Portability and Accountability Act (HIPAA) audit and PCI DSS Standards.

Power
Colocation facilities generally have generators that start automatically when utility power fails, usually running on diesel fuel. These generators may have varying levels of redundancy, depending on how the facility is built. Generators do not start instantaneously, so colocation facilities usually have battery backup systems. In many facilities, the operator of the facility provides large inverters to provide AC power from the batteries. In other cases, customers may install smaller UPSes in their racks.

Some customers choose to use equipment that is powered directly by 48 VDC (nominal) battery banks. This may provide better energy efficiency, and may reduce the number of parts that can fail, though the reduced voltage greatly increases necessary current, and thus the size (and cost) of power delivery wiring. An alternative to batteries is a motor–generator connected to a flywheel and diesel engine.

Many colocation facilities can provide redundant, A and B power feeds to customer equipment, and high end servers and telecommunications equipment often can have two power supplies installed.

Colocation facilities are sometimes connected to multiple sections of the utility power grid for additional reliability.

Internal connections
Colocation facility owners have differing rules regarding cross-connects between their customers, some of whom may be carriers. These rules may allow customers to run such connections at no charge, or allow customers to order such connections for a monthly fee. They may allow customers to order cross-connects to carriers, but not to other customers. Some colocation centres feature a "meet-me-room" where the different carriers housed in the centre can efficiently exchange data.

Most peering points sit in colocation centres and because of the high concentration of servers inside larger colocation centres, most carriers will be interested in bringing direct connections to such buildings. In many cases, there will be a larger Internet exchange point hosted inside a colocation centre, where customers can connect for peering.

See also
 Carrier-neutral data center
 Direct market access

References

External links

 
 Build Or Colocate? The ROI Of Your Next Data Center
 Multi-Tenant Datacenter Global Providers – 2014
 DCK Guide To Modular Data Centers: The Modular Market

Data centers
Internet architecture
Internet hosting
Servers (computing)
Web hosting